John Nelson Anderson (July 15, 1864 - 1936) served in the California State Senate for the 38th district and was born in pre-Confederation Province of Canada.

References

External links
Join California John Nelson Anderson

1864 births
1936 deaths
20th-century American politicians
Republican Party California state senators
People from Peterborough County